The Iron Heart is a Philippine action drama television series broadcast by Kapamilya Channel. Directed by Lester Pimentel Ong and Richard Ibasco Arellano, it stars Richard Gutierrez in the title role. The series premiered on the network's Primetime Bida evening block, Jeepney TV, A2Z Primetime Weeknights, and TV5's Todo Max Primetime Singko, and worldwide via The Filipino Channel and Kapatid Channel on November 14, 2022, replacing 2 Good 2 Be True.

Premise
Apollo Adelantar is an undercover agent who goes on a dangerous mission to bring down a crime ring. Fueled by a bitter and painful past, Apollo and his allies face grueling tasks that will challenge his resolve and strength.

Cast and characters
Main cast
Richard Gutierrez as Apollo "Pol" Adelantar / Olimpio "Tisoy" Custodio

Kyle Echarri as young Apollo
Albert Martinez as Engr. Priam dela Torre
Jake Cuenca as Eros del Rio
Renshi de Guzman as young Eros
Sue Ramirez as Venus Magbanua
Hannah Lopez Vito as young Venus
Diether Ocampo as Echo Madrigal
Dimples Romana as Selene Larisa
Maricel Laxa as Atty. Helen Gomez 
Meryll Soriano as Juno Suárez
Baron Geisler as Janus Salazar
Ryan Eigenmann as Adonis Salvador†
Sofia Andres as Nyx del Rio
Benjie Paras as Jared Gallardo
Pepe Herrera as Poseidon Abusado
Ian Veneracion as Menandro Enriquez

Supporting cast
Roi Vinzon as Hector Adelantar
Enzo Pineda as Hero Sequestro
Joem Bascon as Hermes Nuevo† / Jacob†
 Jeric Raval as John Mariano†
 Anna Marin as Delia Adelantar
Mitoy Yonting as Diony "Bungo" Magbanua†
Louise Abuel as Troy Adelantar
Andi Abaya as Maia Esguerra
Manuel Chua as Romulo Gimenez
Althea Ruedas as Aliyah "Lia" Jusay
Ramon Christopher as Damon Bellona†
Emmanuelle Vera as Athena Omorfia†
Anthony Jennings as Cronus Méndez
Vivoree Esclito as Penelope Sta. Maria
JC Alcantara as Eric Trinidad†
Rafa Siguion-Reyna as Zenon Salonga
Archie Adamos as Sen. Midas Rivero
Ronnie Lazaro as Oak Mateo
Heaven Peralejo as Daphne
Turs Daza as Nawat Verceles
Maika Rivera as Lea Villanueva
Mark McMahon as Henry Rosales
Elvis Gutierrez as Zandro Magsino
Christian Vasquez as Orcus Silverio 
DJ Jhai Ho as Mama D
Brian Sy as Roman Zabale
Lance Pimentel as Dylan
Guest cast
Maja Salvador as Cassandra Jusay†
Karina Bautista as young Cassandra
Al Tantay as Homer Adelantar†
Victor Silayan as Matthew
Ana Abad Santos as Verna
Bart Guingona as Nandy del Rio
Sue Prado as Diana Salonga
Jaycee Parker as Minerva Zamora
Mark Oblea as Sol Austria†
Lance Carr as Jason dela Torre†
Matt Evans as Owen†
Bodjie Pascua as Manny Abusado
Moi Bien as Hestia Abusado
Jay Gonzaga as Nico
Jong Cuenco as Villamor†
Zeus Collins as Liam

Episodes

Season 1

Reception
The official trailer accumulated more than 2.6 million views across all leading social media platforms in its first 24 hours. The series notably drew 269,755 live concurrent viewers last February 23, 2023 on YouTube.

References

Notes

External links
 

ABS-CBN original programming
ABS-CBN drama series
Philippine action television series
Philippine crime television series
Television series about organized crime
Philippine thriller television series
Philippine drama television series
2022 Philippine television series debuts
2020s Philippine television series
Filipino-language television shows
Television series by Star Creatives
Television shows set in the Philippines